The concept of ego reduction is predicated on the use of Sigmund Freud's concept of the ego to describe the conscious adult self; and broadly describes the deflating of an over-inflated or egotistical sense of oneself - a curtailment of what Iris Murdoch called “the anxious avaricious tentacles of the self”.

Among other contexts, ego reduction has been seen as a goal in Alcoholics Anonymous; as a part of BDSM play, providing a means of entering "subspace"; and as a way of attaining religious humility and freedom from desire in Buddhism.

Alcoholics Anonymous
Harry Tiebout saw the surrender of the alcoholic in AA as dependent upon ego reduction, in the twin sense of a relinquishment of personal narcissism, and the development of a new trust in other people.

Tiebout stressed that this was a process that should be applied only to the (over-extended) infantile ego the surviving remnants of an original megalomania that had not been worn away by the normal processes of life.

Therapy
While most therapy favours a process of strengthening the ego functions, at the expense of the irrational parts of the mind, a reduction in self-importance and ego is also generally valorised: Robin Skynner for example describing the 'shrink' as a head-shrinker, and adding that “as our swollen heads get smaller... as people we grow”.

Rational emotive behaviour therapy also favours such ego reduction as a part of extending self-control and confirming personal boundaries.

Buddhism
Ego reduction is traditionally seen as the goal of the Buddha's teaching.

However, the goal of egolessness (as Buddhist therapists warn) is not to be confused with a mere loss or paralysis of ego functions: it is rather their incorporation and transcendence.

See also

References

Freudian psychology
Alcoholics Anonymous